Álvaro Robles may refer to:

 Álvaro Robles (boxer) (born 1986), Mexican boxer
 Álvaro Robles (table tennis), Spanish table tennis player